Loyola College Guatemala is a private Catholic pre-school, primary and secondary school, located in Guatemala City, Guatemala. The Jesuit-run school traces its origins to 1958 at the elementary school at La Merced Catholic church.

History
Loyola College remains on 12th Avenue near 5th Street. In 1965 the preprimary opened and in 1968 the high school. In 1971 the primary added an afternoon session and the pre-primary moved to 12th Avenue 3-69 Zone 1. In 1972 an afternoon session opened for pre-primary. By the 1980s there were over 2,000 students at all three levels.

The College has received three government awards: Order José Rolz Bennet the Municipality of Guatemala and the Order of Quetzal granted by the Government of Guatemala both in 2007, and in 2008 the Pedagogical Order Juan Jose Arevalo granted by the Ministry of Education.

Directors
The following individuals have served as Directors of the school:

See also

 Education in Guatemala
 List of Jesuit schools

References

Elementary and primary schools in Guatemala
Guatemala
Educational institutions established in 1958
1958 establishments in Guatemala
High schools and secondary schools in Guatemala
Schools in Guatemala City